The Betrayal is a 1966 novel by the British writer L.P. Hartley. It is a sequel to his 1964 work The Brickfield in which an elderly novelist recounts the experiences of his life for his memoirs.

References

Bibliography
  Wright, Adrian. Foreign Country: The Life of L.P. Hartley. I. B. Tauris, 2001.

1966 British novels
Novels by L. P. Hartley
Hamish Hamilton books
Novels about writers